Joseph Roger Louis Léveillé,  commonly known as J. R. Léveillé or J. Roger Léveillé, is a Canadian writer from Winnipeg, Manitoba. A key figure in Franco-Manitoban literature, he is most noted for his 2001 novel The Setting Lake Sun (Le soleil du lac qui se couche), which won the Prix Rue-Deschambault for Franco-Manitoban literature in 2002, and was selected for the 2020 edition of Le Combat des livres.

Unusually in Canadian literature, both the original French Le soleil du lac qui se couche and its English translation The Setting Lake Sun were published concurrently in 2001; normally, Canadian literature in translation is not published until several months or even years after the original version. Sue Stewart, the novel's translator, received an honorable mention from the John Glassco Translation Prize for The Setting Lake Sun.

Léveillé was educated at the University of Manitoba and in France, writing his master's thesis on the work of Alain Robbe-Grillet. He has published numerous works of poetry, fiction and non-fiction since 1968, and his most recent novel, Ganiishomong, ou l’extase du temps, was published in 2020.

He was awarded the Manitoba Arts Council's Award of Distinction in 2012.

Works
Tombeau, 1968
La disparate, 1975
Œuvre de la première mort, 1977
Le livre des marges, 1981
Plage, 1984
Extrait, 1984
L’incomparable, 1984
Montréal poésie, 1987
Causer l’amour, 1993
Les fêtes de l’infini, 1996
Une si simple passion, 1997
Pièces à conviction, 1999
Dess(e)ins, 1999
Le soleil du lac qui se couche, 2001
Dess(e)ins II/Drawing(s) II, 2001
Fastes, 2003
Nosara, 2003
New York Trip, 2003
rRr, 2005
Parade ou Les autres par J.R. Léveillé, 2005
Logiques improvisées, essais, Éditions du Blé, 2005.
Généalogie de Lieu, 2005
Transformation, 2006
Litanie, 2008
L'Étang du Soir, 2008
Pierre Lardon - Poésies choisies, 2011.
Poème Pierre Prière - 2011
L'Invocation de Rutebeuf et de Villon, 2012
Sûtra, 2013
Sondes, 2014
Ganiishomong, ou l’extase du temps, 2020

References

1945 births
Living people
20th-century Canadian male writers
20th-century Canadian non-fiction writers
20th-century Canadian novelists
20th-century Canadian poets
21st-century Canadian male writers
21st-century Canadian non-fiction writers
21st-century Canadian novelists
21st-century Canadian poets
Canadian non-fiction writers in French
Canadian novelists in French
Canadian poets in French
Canadian male non-fiction writers
Canadian male novelists
Canadian male poets
Franco-Manitoban people
University of Manitoba alumni
Writers from Winnipeg
Officers of the Order of Canada